Trevor Campbell (born 15 November 1950) is a Barbadian cricketer. He played in one first-class match for the Barbados cricket team in 1969/70.

See also
 List of Barbadian representative cricketers

References

External links
 

1950 births
Living people
Barbadian cricketers
Barbados cricketers
People from Saint Michael, Barbados